Taufkirchen is the name of several places:

Germany (Bavaria) 

 Taufkirchen (bei München), a small community south of Munich, near Oberhaching and Unterhaching in southern Germany
 Taufkirchen (Vils), a municipality in the district of Erding in Bavaria in Germany
 Taufkirchen (Mühldorf), a municipality in the district of Mühldorf in Bavaria in Germany

Austria 
 Taufkirchen an der Pram
 Taufkirchen an der Trattnach